Fremont is a neighborhood in Seattle, Washington, United States. Originally a separate city, it was annexed to Seattle in 1891. It is named after Fremont, Nebraska, the hometown of two of its founders: Luther H. Griffith and Edward Blewett.

Geography
Fremont is situated along the Fremont Cut of the Lake Washington Ship Canal to the north of Queen Anne, the east of Ballard, the south of Phinney Ridge, and the southwest of Wallingford. Its boundaries are not formally fixed, but they can be thought of as consisting of the Ship Canal to the south, Stone Way N. to the east, N. 50th Street to the north, and 8th Avenue N.W. to the west.

The neighborhood's main thoroughfares are Fremont and Aurora Avenues N. (north- and southbound) and N. 46th, 45th, 36th, and 34th Streets (east- and westbound). The Aurora Bridge (George Washington Memorial Bridge) carries Aurora Avenue (State Route 99) over the Ship Canal to the top of Queen Anne Hill, and the Fremont Bridge carries Fremont Avenue over the canal to the hill's base. A major shopping district is centered on Fremont Avenue N. just north of the bridge.

Counterculture

Fremont is sometimes referred to as "The People's Republic of Fremont" or "The Artists' Republic of Fremont," and was at one time a center of counterculture; however, the neighborhood has become somewhat gentrified since the 1990s.  It remains home to a controversial statue of Vladimir Lenin salvaged from Slovakia by an art lover from Washington state who was teaching in the area at the time. After the 1989 fall of the Communist government, he brought the statue to Fremont with money raised through a mortgage on his house. The Fremont Troll is an  concrete sculpture of a troll crushing a Volkswagen Beetle in its left hand, created in 1990 and situated under the north end of the Aurora Bridge. The street running under the bridge and ending at the Troll was renamed Troll Avenue N. in 2005.

The neighborhood also features various signs giving advice such as "set your watch back five minutes," "set your watch forward five minutes," and "throw your watch away." Other landmarks include the Fremont Rocket, a Fairchild C-119 tail boom modified to resemble a missile, and the outdoor sculpture Waiting for the Interurban.

Since the early 1970s some Fremont residents have been referring to their neighborhood as "The Center of the Universe" (which also appears on a large "Welcome" sign). An unofficial motto "De Libertas Quirkas" ("Freedom to be Peculiar" in mock Latin) appears in brochures and websites about the area.

Events and institutions
The Fremont Arts Council sponsors several highly attended annual events in Fremont. The Summer Solstice Parade & Pageant has made Fremont famous for its nude Solstice Cyclists. Another event is Troll-a-ween.

Also important to Fremont is the large block on Linden Avenue N. that contains the B.F. Day Elementary School and B.F. Day Playground, two separate entities. B.F. Day is the longest continually operating school in the Seattle school district, having been founded in 1892.

Another longstanding institution is the Fremont branch of the Seattle Public Library. An informal library predated the 1891 annexation of Fremont to Seattle, and annexation made it the city's first branch library. The present structure dates from 1921.

Besides the B.F. Day playfield, Fremont has three small public parks, Fremont Peak Park just south of N. 45th Street, Ross Park and Playground at 3rd Avenue NW and NW 43rd Street, and A.B. Ernst Park next to the library. Ernst Park was named for Ambrose Ernst, a Fremont resident. He was known as the "Father of City Playfields". He served on the  Board of Park Commissioners from 1906 to 1913 and helped implement Seattle's Olmsted parks plan.

The Burke-Gilman Trail passes through Fremont just north of the Lake Washington Ship Canal. The large Gas Works Park is just east of Fremont on the north shore of Lake Union.

Companies and organizations
Theo Chocolate's factory and store, golf and daywear label Cutter & Buck's corporate headquarters, and Brooks Sports' headquarters are located here. Fremont has several breweries including Hale's Ales brewery and the Fremont Brewing. The original Redhook breweries were located in Fremont until their closures in 1988 and 2002, respectively. Google opened offices here in 2006, and the parent company of Geocaching.com is headquartered in Fremont.

A growing number of technology companies have offices in Fremont, including Adobe Systems, the Allen Institute for Brain Science, Google, SDL PLC, Groundspeak, Impinj, Sporcle, and Tableau Software. Most of these offices are along the Lake Washington Ship Canal.

The neighborhood is home to a number of nonprofit organizations, including Literacy Source and Provail, a provider of social services to people with disabilities and an affiliate of the United Cerebral Palsy network.

A wedge-shaped building on the diagonal street Leary Way that cuts across Fremont from the adjacent Ballard neighborhood was once home to legendary Seattle producer Jack Endino's Reciprocal Recording studio, where he recorded (among many other records) Nirvana's first demos and the band's debut on Sub Pop records, Bleach.

Notes

External links
 

 HistoryLink History of Fremont
 Fremont Chamber of Commerce
 Seattle Photograph Collection, Fremont - University of Washington Digital Collection

 
Counterculture communities